"Wild Things" is a song recorded by Canadian singer-songwriter Alessia Cara for her debut studio album, Know-It-All (2015). It was released to digital retailers on October 27, 2015, as a promotional single before being sent to contemporary hit radio on February 2, 2016, as the album's second official single. The song was written by Alessia Caracciolo, Coleridge Tillman, Thabiso "Tab" Nkhereanye, and James Ho, and was produced by the latter. Official remixes were commissioned in the spring of 2016 and were released on an extended play on May 13, 2016, one of which features a guest verse from American rapper G-Eazy.

Since its release, "Wild Things" has charted at number fifty on the US Billboard Hot 100 and has also attained top-forty peaks in multiple territories including Australia, Canada, and New Zealand. In Cara's native Canada, the song peaked at number 14, five positions higher than her highly successful debut, "Here". The song has been certified Gold by ARIA, 2× Platinum by the RIAA, while being certified Platinum by RMNZ.

Production
"Wild Things" was recorded in Los Angeles in December 2014; the inspiration for the song came about after a conversation between Cara and her A&R Thabiso Nkhereanye, regarding some hats that bore a message that Cara disapproved of.

Critical reception

Mike Wass of Idolator called it "Another fiery celebration of outsiders." Rolling Stones Brittany Spanos labeled it "anthemic" and a "celebration of youth", saying "[Wild Things] follows in the vein of the anti-cool kid stance on 'Here.' Unlike her debut single, however, Cara goes for more straight-up pop on the more fast-paced, percussive tune." Jessie Morris of Complex stated that the song is "another infectious and insightful coming-of-age track."

Music video
An accompanying music video for "Wild Things" was directed by Aaron A and premiered on March 7, 2016. Opening with a monologue in which Cara describes what "wild" means to her in the song, the video features Cara and her friends exploring Brampton and the suburbs of Toronto, engaging in carefree activities such as drawing fake tattoos on one another and setting off fireworks at Cherry Beach. "To me," Cara says during the video's introductory sequence, "Where The Wild Things Are is a place that exists in our minds. It's a place of liberty and shamelessness. It can take a split second or a lifetime to find it, but once you do, you'll be free." The video was nominated for Best Pop Video on the 2016 MTV Video Music Awards.

Track listings

Charts

Weekly charts

Year-end charts

Certifications

Radio and release history

Notes

References

2015 songs
2016 singles
Alessia Cara songs
Def Jam Recordings singles
Music videos directed by Aaron A
Songs with feminist themes
Songs written by Malay (record producer)
Songs written by Alessia Cara
Songs written by Sebastian Kole